Soheil Vahedi (born March 15, 1989) is an Iranian former professional snooker player.

Career
In 2009 Vahedi entered the World Amateur Under-21 Snooker Championships in his home country in Kish, Iran in which he reached the final, before he lost 9–8 Noppon Saengkham. Seven years following his disappointment in Kish, Vahedi made it to the final of the World Amateur Snooker Championship where he defeated Andrew Pagett 8–1 to win the 2016 IBSF World Snooker Championship, as a result he was offered a two-year card on the professional World Snooker Tour for the 2017–18 and 2018–19 seasons. In May 2019, Vahedi came through Q-School - Event 1 by winning five matches to earn a two-year card on the World Snooker Tour for the 2019–20 and 2020–21 seasons.

Performance and rankings timeline

Career finals

Pro-am finals: 1

Amateur finals: 2 (1 title)

References

External links
Soheil Vahedi at worldsnooker.com
Soheil Vahedi at CueTracker.net: Snooker Results and Statistic Database

Iranian snooker players
Living people
1989 births
Cue sports players at the 2010 Asian Games
Sportspeople from Tehran
World Games bronze medalists
Competitors at the 2017 World Games
Asian Games competitors for Iran
Competitors at the 2009 World Games